Jane Ann Henson (née Nebel; June 16, 1934 – April 2, 2013) was an American puppeteer and the wife of Jim Henson.

Early life
Jane Ann Nebel was born and raised in St. Albans, Queens, she met Henson when she was a senior and he a freshman at the University of Maryland, College Park.

Nebel was a member of Alpha Xi Delta sorority.

Career
Jane Nebel and Jim Henson worked together on the live 1950s television show Sam and Friends, where Jane collaborated with Jim in performing Muppets and devising several of the show's technical innovations, including the use of television monitors to watch their performances in real time. When, in the late 1950s, Jim took a year off from Sam and Friends to travel in Europe, Jane ran the show, with the help of a UMD classmate.

"Among the first of his assignments at WRC was Afternoon, a magazine show aimed at housewives. This marked his first collaboration with Jane Nebel – the woman who later became his wife" They did not begin dating until Jim returned from Europe where he traveled for several months, to be inspired by European puppeteers who look on their work as an art form. They were married on May 28, 1959 at Jane's family home in Salisbury, Maryland.

When she quit full-time puppeteering in the early 1960s to raise their children, Jim hired Jerry Juhl and Frank Oz to replace her. She helped Oz learn how to lip sync, and continued to perform non-speaking muppets on Sesame Street from time to time through at least the eighties. She was also responsible for the hiring of puppeteer Steve Whitmire (who would later take over performing Kermit the Frog and Ernie of Sesame Street after the death of Jim Henson in 1990) in 1978 after he gave her an impromptu audition in an Atlanta, Georgia airport restaurant.

In 1990, the Henson Company went into an agreement with Disney to present a live stage show: Here Come The Muppets, at Disney/MGM Studio. Jane was the main developer in the training of performers and profile creation for the walk-around versions of the Muppets. She was able to share the Henson spirit of the ten characters that joined Disney at the time: Kermit the Frog, Miss Piggy, Fozzie Bear, Gonzo the Great, Bean Bunny, as well as five members of the Electric Mayhem Band. 

Towards the end of her life, Jane conceived the idea of a stylized puppet show based on the Gospel accounts of the birth of Jesus. Together with a small group of collaborators, she created a live theatre piece featuring tabletop manger figure puppets built by the Jim Henson Creature Shop. Jane Henson's Nativity Story premiered at the 2010 Orlando Puppet Festival. After Henson's death in 2013, vignettes from the stage show were used in the CBS television special "A New York Christmas to Remember", narrated by Regis Philbin. A tribute to Henson from family and friends was part of the national broadcast.

Personal life
Jane and Jim Henson married in 1959; together they had five children: Lisa (born 1960), Cheryl (born 1961), Brian (born 1963), John (1965–2014), and Heather Henson (born 1970). Jane and Jim separated in 1986, although they remained close until his death in 1990. In 1992, she established The Jim Henson Legacy to preserve and perpetuate the work of her husband. She served on the boards of the Jim Henson Foundation and the American Center for Children's Television.

Illness and death
On March 20, 2013, her daughter Cheryl revealed that her mother had cancer and was paralyzed; she asked fans to keep Jane in their prayers. Jane Henson died from the disease at the family home in Greenwich, Connecticut, on April 2, 2013, at the age of 78. She was buried at Saint Bridge Cemetery, Cornwall, Connecticut. The film Muppets Most Wanted was dedicated to her and Jerry Nelson (who also died aged 78).

References

External links

1934 births
2013 deaths
American puppeteers
Deaths from cancer in Connecticut
Henson family (show business)
Muppet performers
People from Greenwich, Connecticut
People from St. Albans, Queens
Sesame Street Muppeteers
University of Maryland, College Park alumni
Jim Henson